Evidence-based assessment (EBA) refers to the use of research and theory to guide the selection of constructs to be used for a specific assessment purpose and to inform the methods and measures used in the assessment process. It involves the recognition that, even with data from psychometrically strong measures, the assessment process is inherently a decision-making task in which the clinician must iteratively formulate and test hypotheses by integrating data that are often incomplete and consistent. EBA has been found to help clinicians in cognitively debiasing their clinical decisions. Evidence-based assessment is part of a larger movement towards evidence-based practices.

EBA was first introduced in the field of medicine, and has been introduced to other fields, notably clinical psychology. The EBA approach is widely acknowledged to be an empirically driven method to clinical decision-making, and Cochrane reviews have reported the efficacy of EBA methods.

History and development

Limitations

Test selection and inadequate assessment 

While numerous guidelines have been developed to assist psychologists in conducting EBAs, psychologists often fail to follow guidelines, with projective tests often used to assess child adjustment. Professionals conducting assessment have been shown to have considerable variability in the extent to which they followed professional guidelines, with evaluators failing to assess general parenting abilities.

Problems in test interpretation 

Professionals and authorities commonly mistakenly recommend the interpretation of variability between and within scales that may not be vigorously tested. For instance, due to rigorous efforts in developing norms, and developing reliability and validity measures, certain measures, such as the Wechsler intelligence scales for both adults and children, are seen as the strongest psychological instruments around. It is common practice for authorities to recommend the consideration of subtest scores. However, subtest scores, unlike full-scale IQ scores, often have lower levels of internal consistency reliability, which results in reduced precision of measurement and increased likelihood of false positive and false negative conclusions about the assessment.

References 

Evidence-based medicine
Psychological testing
Mental disorders screening and assessment tools
Evidence-based practices